The 59th Street station was a local station on the demolished IRT Ninth Avenue Line in Manhattan, New York City. It had two levels. The lower level was built first and had two tracks and two side platforms that served local trains. The upper level was built as part of the Dual Contracts and had one track that served express trains. It closed on June 11, 1940. The next southbound stop was 50th Street for Ninth Avenue trains and Eighth Avenue for IRT Sixth Avenue Line trains. The next northbound stop was 66th Street.

On September 11, 1905, 12 people were killed and 42 injured in the Ninth Avenue derailment when a train that had just left the station was wrongly switched onto the curve at 53rd Street.

References

External links 
9th Avenue El(Forgotten NY.com)

IRT Ninth Avenue Line stations
Railway stations in the United States opened in 1879
Railway stations closed in 1940
Former elevated and subway stations in Manhattan
1879 establishments in New York (state)
1940 disestablishments in New York (state)
59th Street (Manhattan)